MSIAC may refer to: 
Modeling and Simulation Information Analysis Center, of the U.S. Department of Defense
Munitions Safety Information Analysis Center, of NATO